Brian Alexander (born 1957) is a British media and public affairs adviser. He is Communications Director of UK Oil and Gas PLC and UK Energy Storage Ltd. Previously his chief client was Sepp Blatter and football world governing body FIFA.

He was previously best known as a presenter on BBC Radio Five Live in the UK and on the BBC World Service until January 2011 when he made the move into communications and public relations. He hosted the Radio Five programmes Late Night Live and Weekend Breakfast, and launched and presented Sportsweek on the same network. He also presented the BBC's Sport Specials. His stand-out extended interviews included those with Jonny Wilkinson, Sepp Blatter, Joey Barton and Thaksin Shinawatra, while he also researched and presented investigations into right-wing football violence in eastern Europe, corruption in Italian football, gambling in tennis, and the young African boys who are abandoned in Europe after being conned by agents.

During an 18-year career in the British press, Alexander worked for nine different national papers. In addition to being sports editor on The Sun, he was also sports editor of the Mail on Sunday and the London Evening Standard.

After a long career in newspaper journalism, Alexander began presenting programmes for the BBC in 1996, beginning with The Back Page on Five Live before moving on to present the sports bulletins on the BBC Radio 4 Today programme.

He then launched and presented two popular Five Live shows: Sportsweek on Sunday mornings, and Papertalk on Friday evenings. He won a Gold at the Sony Radio Awards for Magazine Programme of the Year.

After hosting both shows for two years, Alexander took over Late Night Live, making the transition from sport to news and current affairs. He presented Weekend Breakfast on BBC Radio Five Live from late 2001 until 2006.

He also has television experience. He presented The Lion's Den on BBC1 in March 1999, interviewing previous England football managers Bobby Robson, Graham Taylor, Terry Venables and Glenn Hoddle prior to Kevin Keegan's first match in charge.

He also presented Sunday Turnstyle on Channel 5 for 12 months and Sportspage on cable network Channel One.

Alexander launched and edited the lifestyle magazine Essence of Surrey.

References
 Agent's bio of Brian Alexander

1957 births
Living people
BBC Radio 5 Live presenters
British radio personalities
Place of birth missing (living people)